Doubleday is a surname. Notable people with the name include:

Publishing family 
 Frank Nelson Doubleday (1862–1934), American businessman, founder of Doubleday & McClure Company in 1897
 Nelson Doubleday (1889–1949), American book publisher and president of Doubleday Company
 Nelson Doubleday Jr. (1933–2015), last president of Doubleday and Company
 Neltje Doubleday Kings (born 1934), American artist and philanthropist, daughter of Nelson Doubleday
 Russell Doubleday (1872–1949), American author, editor and publisher, brother of Frank Nelson Doubleday

New York family 
 Abner Doubleday (1819–1893), American Civil War Union general and disputed inventor of baseball
 Mary Stewart Doubleday Cutting (1851–1924), American author and daughter of Ulysses F Doubleday
 Stephen Ward Doubleday, (1845–1926), American banker and Civil War soldier, son of Thomas D. Doubleday
 Thomas D. Doubleday (1792–1866), American bookstore owner and Civil War officer
 Ulysses Doubleday (general) (1824–1893), American Civil War general
 Ulysses F. Doubleday (1792–1866), American printer, congressman from New York, father of Thomas D. Doubleday, Abner Doubleday, Ulysses Doubleday, and Mary Stewart Doubleday Cutting

Scientific family 
 Edward Doubleday (1811–1849), English entomologist
 Henry Doubleday (entomologist) (1808–1875), English entomologist and ornithologist, brother of Edward Doubleday
 Henry Doubleday (horticulturalist) (1810–1902), English scientist and horticulturalist, cousin of Henry and Edward Doubleday

Acting family 
 Frank Doubleday (actor) (1945–2018), American actor, father of Portia Doubleday and Kaitlin Doubleday
 Kaitlin Doubleday (born 1984), American actress 
 Portia Doubleday (born 1988), American actress

Other people 
 Arthur Doubleday, (1865–1951), Bishop of Brentwood in the Roman Catholic Church
 Edmund Doubleday (died 1620), English politician who helped capture Guy Fawkes
 Geoff Doubleday (born 1940), Australian rules footballer 
 Jack Doubleday (1890–1918), Australian footballer
 John Doubleday (restorer) (about 1798 – 1856), British craftsman and restorer
 John Doubleday (sculptor) (born 1947), British painter and sculptor
 John Gordon Doubleday (1920–1982), British diplomat
 Ken Doubleday (born 1926), Australian Olympian athlete
 Neltje Doubleday (disambiguation), several people
 Ralph R. Doubleday (1881–1958), American rodeo photographer
 Thomas Doubleday (1790–1870), English politician and author